Wukongibacter is a Gram-positive, spore-forming, rod-shaped, anaerobic and non-motile genus of bacteria from the family of Peptostreptococcaceae with one known species (Wukongibacter baidiensis).

References

Peptostreptococcaceae
Bacteria genera
Monotypic bacteria genera
Taxa described in 2016
Bacteria described in 2016